M. indicus may refer to:
 Malacosteus indicus, the stoplight loosejaw, a fish species
 Marumba indicus, a species of hawk moth
 Mediorhynchus indicus, a species of spiny-headed worm
 Melanobatrachus indicus, a frog species endemic to southern Western Ghats of India
 Melichthys indicus, the Indian triggerfish, a fish species
 Melilotus indicus, a yellow-flowered herb species native to northern Africa, Europe and Asia
 Methanocaldococcus indicus, a species of coccoid methanogen archaea
 Metopidius indicus, the bronze-winged jacana, a bird species
 Monopterus indicus, the Bombay swamp eel, a fish species
 Morimus indicus, a species of longhorn beetle
 Mucor indicus, a fungus species
 Mycobacterium indicus pranii, a member of the Myobacterium avium complex

Synonyms 
 Microvirga indicus, a synonym of Microvirga indica

See also
 Indicus (disambiguation)